Lixinae is a subfamily of true weevils, included in the Molytinae in many older treatments. They are mainly root feeders, although some develop in flower buds or stems. Several species are used in biological control of invasive weeds, namely knapweeds (Centaurea).

Characteristics include tarsal claws that are fused at the base, and labial palps are short and telescoping. The body is elongate shape, as for some other weevils. Each tibia bears an uncus (small hook) on its distal end. The rostrum is forwardly directed.

Genesis 
Bearing in mind modern geographical distribution of Lixinae and its feeding links,  it is considered to be that this subfamily appeared in Euroasian lands, when  the area of  Tethys Ocean demenished. Probably, lixine weevils formed as group in the arid conditions  of the deserts of  Ancient Mediterranean. From here pra-lixine spread out the over dryland.

Taxonomy 
There are three tribes. The largest of these by far are the Cleonini, sometimes ranked as an independent subfamily in the past:

Cleonini

 Adosomus
 Afghanocleonus
 Ammocleonus
 Aparotopus
 Aplesilus
 Apleurus
 Asinocleonus
 Asproparthenis
 Atactogaster
 Bodemeyeria
 Bothynoderes
 Brachycleonus
 Calodemas
 Centrocleonus
 Chromonotus
 Chromosomus
 Cleonis
 Cleonogonus
 Cleonolithus
 Cnemodontus
 Coniocleonus
 Conorhynchus
 Cosmogaster
 Curculionites
 Cyphocleonus
 Entymetopus
 Eocleonus
 Epexochus
 Ephimeronotus
 Epirrhynchus
 Eumecops
 Eurycleonus
 Georginus
 Gonocleonus
 Hemeurysternus
 Heterocleonus
 Isomerops
 Koenigius
 Leucochromus
 Leucomigus
 Leucophyes
 Liocleonus
 Lixocleonus
 Lixomorphus
 Lixopachys
 Mecaspis
 Menecleonus
 Mesocleonus
 Microcleonus
 Mongolocleonus
 Monolophus
 Neocleonus
 Nomimonyx
 Pachycerus
 Pajnisoodes
 Paraleucochromus
 Pentatropis
 Phaulosomus
 Pleurocleonus
 Pliocleonus
 Porocleonus
 Priorhinus
 Pseudisomerus
 Pseudocleonus
 Pycnodactylopsis
 Resmecaspis
 Rhabdorrhynchus
 Rungsonymus
 Scaphomorphus
 Stephanocleonus
 Surchania
 Temnorhinus
 Terminasiania
 Tetragonothorax
 Trachydemus
 Trichocleonus
 Trichotocleonus
 Whiteheadia
 Xanthochelus
 Xenomacrus
 Zaslavskia

Lixini

 Broconius
 Eugeniodecus
 Eustenopus
 Gasteroclisus
 Hololixus
 Hypolixus
 Ileomus
 Lachnaeus
 Larinus
 Lixus
 Microlarinus
 Microlixus
 Mycotrichus

Rhinocyllini
 Bangasternus
 Rhinocyllus

References

External links 

 
Beetle subfamilies